Jimmy Lee Thorpe (born February 1, 1949) is an American professional golfer, currently playing on the Champions Tour.

Early life
Thorpe was born in Roxboro, North Carolina, the ninth of the twelve children of a fairway superintendent. He attended Morgan State University.

Professional career
Thorpe turned professional in 1972. He won three times on the PGA Tour in the mid-1980s. He has surpassed this at senior level by winning over ten times, including one senior major championship (the 2002 Tradition) and making the top ten of the Champions Tour's career money list in 2004.

Thorpe's late success has been clouded by charges filed in federal court in Orlando, Florida, charging him with failure to pay $1.6 million in taxes between the years 2002 and 2004. After his lawyer stated that Thorpe intended to plead innocent to the charges, Thorpe pleaded guilty in September 2009. On January 22, 2010, Thorpe was sentenced to one year in prison for the crime.

Thorpe was released from prison on January 17, 2011. He was under suspension by the PGA Tour until March 31 and then resumed his career on the Champions Tour.

Professional wins (21)

PGA Tour wins (3)

PGA Tour playoff record (0–1)

Canadian Tour wins (1)

Other wins (3)
1991 Amoco Centel Championship, Jamaica Open
1993 Jerry Ford Invitational (tie with Jay Delsing, and Donnie Hammond)

Champions Tour wins (13)

*Note: The 2001 Kroger Senior Classic was shortened to 36 holes due to rain.

Champions Tour playoff record (3–1)

Other senior wins (1)
2014 Big Cedar Lodge Legends of Golf - Legends Division (with Jim Colbert)

Results in major championships

CUT = missed the half-way cut
WD = withdrew
"T" indicates a tie for a place

Summary

Most consecutive cuts made – 4 (twice)
Longest streak of top-10s – 1 (three times)

Results in The Players Championship

CUT = missed the halfway cut
WD = withdrew
"T" indicates a tie for a place

Senior major championships

Wins (1)

Results timeline
Results not in chronological order before 2016.

The Senior British Open was not a Champions Tour major until 2003.

CUT = missed the halfway cut
"T" indicates a tie for a place

See also
Fall 1975 PGA Tour Qualifying School graduates
Fall 1978 PGA Tour Qualifying School graduates
List of golfers with most Champions Tour wins

References

External links

American male golfers
PGA Tour golfers
PGA Tour Champions golfers
Winners of senior major golf championships
African-American golfers
Golfers from North Carolina
Golfers from Florida
American people convicted of tax crimes
People from Roxboro, North Carolina
People from Heathrow, Florida
1949 births
Living people
21st-century African-American people
20th-century African-American sportspeople